Croatia has participated in the Eurovision Song Contest 27 times since making its debut at the 1993 contest. Their entry has since 1993, excluding from 2012 to 2018, been selected at the Dora pop festival, an event organised by the national public broadcaster Croatian Radiotelevision (HRT).

Croatia achieved six top ten results in seven years, with Magazin and Lidija sixth, Maja Blagdan fourth (1996), former Magazin member Danijela Martinović fifth (1998), Doris Dragović (who was 11th for Yugoslavia in ) fourth, Goran Karan ninth (2000), and Vanna tenth (2001). Since then, Croatia has failed to reach the top ten.

In total, Croatia has failed to reach the final in 9 of the last 13 contests it has entered.

History
Apart from being the most successful Yugoslav republic in the contest, it gave the socialist republic its only win, "Rock Me", sung by Riva in 1989 in Lausanne. The  was held in Zagreb as a result.

If HRT had been a member of the EBU in time for the contest, the first Croatian entry at Eurovision would have been the band Magazin with "Aleluja".

Croatia's first entry as an independent state was in 1993 with the band Put, performing "Don't Ever Cry" which was, despite the English title, also partially performed in Croatian. The song came third in the Kvalifikacija za Millstreet pre-selection event, which allowed their participation in the 1993 contest. Croatia's best placing to date has been with Maja Blagdan's 1996 entry "Sveta ljubav" and Doris Dragović's 1999 entry "Marija Magdalena", both of which came in fourth place.

Along with Cyprus, Malta, Norway, Portugal and Sweden, Croatia was never relegated in the 1990s, and, unlike Cyprus, Norway and Portugal, it was never relegated in the beginning of the 21st century. Relegation meant that the country would have to sit out the subsequent contest due to poor placement.

Croatia would not return to the contest in 2015, and on 5 May 2015, HRT announced that it wouldn't broadcast the 2015 contest either. It was the first time since 1992 for HRT to not broadcast the contest.

On 26 November 2015, it was announced that Croatia would return to the contest in 2016. It was also reported that the entry would possibly be the winner of the first season of  The Voice – Najljepši glas Hrvatske. Nina Kraljić won The Voice and was selected to represent Croatia with the internally selected song "Lighthouse". The entry qualified for the final, making it the first time Croatia had made it to the final since 2009. After the successful return in 2016, Croatian national broadcaster HRT confirmed on 17 September 2016 that they would also participate in 2017. Jacques Houdek, the coach of Nina Kraljić in The Voice, was internally selected to represent the country on 17 February 2017, exactly five months after they confirmed the participation.

On 30 October 2018, it was announced by HRT that the national final, Dora, would return in 2019, traditionally taking place in Opatija, a famous summer resort. In March 2021, it was confirmed that HRT and Opatija had signed a three-year long contract regarding the organization of HRT Music Days and Dora, meaning both of these events will be held in the city annually until 2024.

Participation overview 

Awards

Barbara Dex Award

Related involvement

Conductors

Heads of delegation

The public broadcaster of each participating country in the Eurovision Song Contest assigns a head of delegation as the EBU's contact person and the leader of their delegation at the event. The delegation, whose size can greatly vary, includes a head of press, the contestants, songwriters, composers and backing vocalists, among others.

Commentators and spokespersons

Gallery

See also
Croatia in the Junior Eurovision Song Contest
Dora Pejačević

Notes and references

Notes

References

External links

"Dora" - Croatian ESC Pre-selection
Povijest Dore  eurosong.hr

 
Music festivals in Croatia
Countries in the Eurovision Song Contest